Brownfield is an unincorporated community in Fayette County, Pennsylvania, United States. Brownfield has a post office, with ZIP code 15416.

References

Unincorporated communities in Fayette County, Pennsylvania
Unincorporated communities in Pennsylvania